The International Polo Cup, also called the Newport Cup and the Westchester Cup, is a trophy in polo that was created in 1876 and was played for by teams from the United States and United Kingdom. The match has varied in length over the years from a single game to the best of three games. In 1886 the two nations decided to make the polo match a continuing competition. A total of 12 matches were conducted between 1886 and 1939 between the two countries. The tournament was suspended during World War II and, due to changing times and interests, not revived until 1992. The last match was held in 2019 at the International Polo Club, Wellington, Fl and the US team won by one goal.

History
The cup was first awarded to the team of Capt.John Henry Watson in 1876* in Newport, Rhode Island. The cup was later purchased by a subscription and presented to the Westchester Polo Club in 1886. It was won again in 1886 and 1902 by English teams from the Hurlingham Club. *This is unlikely. Capt. Watson served with the 13th Huzzars in India from 1874 to 1882. He is documented as winning the Grand Military Steeplechase of India in 1878. (British Newspapers 19.03.1878).

In 1909 James Montaudevert Waterbury, Jr., Lawrence Waterbury, Harry Payne Whitney and Devereaux Milburn formed a team, dubbed the Big Four, that won the cup from the English. The same team was successful in 1911 and 1913, but lost the cup to England in 1914.

In the 1920s and 1930s, the Westchester Cup was the most anticipated event on the sporting calendar in the United States.

Winner
The cup has been won a total of 10 times by the United States and 6 times by England, including the initial 1876 match. The match was suspended in the 1940s due to World War II and was not revived until the 1990s.

External links
International Polo Cup team photographs

References

 
Recurring sporting events established in 1876